The National Kaohsiung Normal University (NKNU; Kaohsiung Normal University), founded in 1967, is a public university located in Lingya District, Kaohsiung, Taiwan. The university has two campuses — Ho-Ping and Yen-Chao. The University currently has five colleges: College of Education, College of Humanities, College of Science, College of Technology, and College of Arts.

History
The university was originally established as Provincial Kaohsiung Female Teachers' College in 1954. In 1967, the college was renamed as Taiwan Provincial Kaohsiung Teachers' College by the Taiwan Provincial Government. On July 01, 1980 the college was renamed National Kaohsiung Teachers' College. On 1 August 1989, it was re-designated as National Kaohsiung Normal University. In 1989, the university initiated the plan to build the second campus in Yanchao District and inaugurated the campus in 1990.

Campus
There are currently more than 60 intramural student organizations, each with a faculty member as a consultant. The eight-floor multi-purpose Activity Center makes space available for clubs and recreational activities. Both on Ho-Ping and Yen-Chao campuses, the University provides men’s and women’s dormitories. Meals are provided on campus with the coordination of food committee. Respectively on each campus, there is also a Medicare Center with physicians, dentists and psychiatrists to provide medical services to faculty and students.

Ho-Ping Campus
Located in urban Kaohsiung, opposite the Chiang Kai-shek Cultural Center, the campus covers an area of 13 hectares.

Yen-Chao Campus
In September 1999, NKNU inaugurated its second campus at Yen-Chao, which is an area of 50 hectares about 30 minutes drive from downtown Kaohsiung.

Committee of International Student Admissions
National Kaohsiung Normal University - International Cooperation Section Office of Research and Development

Registration and Tuition & Fees
Each academic year in Taiwan begins on August 1 and ends on July 31 of the following year. 
First semester classes usually begin in mid-September or late September and ends in mid-Jan.
Second semester classes begin in late February of the following calendar year and ends in mid-June.

Academics

NKNU offers Bachelor's degrees, Master's degrees, and Doctorate degrees in many disciplines.

Programs Degrees Offer to International Students
Undergraduate Program： 4–6 years
Master Program/Postgraduate Program： 2–3 years
Doctoral Program： 2–6 years
National Kaohsiung Normal University Bulletin of International Student Admissions 2013-2014 Academic Year
Application from 21 March 2013 to 15 April 2013
Delivery of Application Postmarked by 15 April 2013 (Taiwan Time)

International Sister Universities

 Australia
Curtin University
University of Sydney
 Canada
University of Ottawa
 China
Beijing Normal University
Shanghai Normal University
South China Normal University
East China Normal University
Northeast Normal University
Shaanxi Normal University
Central China Normal University
Hunan Normal University
Renmin University of China
Guangzhou University
Jinan University
Nanchang University
Xiamen University
 Hungary
Franz Liszt Academy of Music
 Czech
Czech Technical University in Prague
 France
Paris Diderot University
 Germany
University of Paderborn
 Hong Kong
Education University of Hong Kong
 India
Vel Tech Rangarajan Dr.Sagunthala R&D Institute of Science and Technology (Deemed to be University), Chennai
 Japan
Osaka Kyoiku University
Hosei University
 Korea
Hallym University
Kyungpook National University
 Malaysia
Universiti Tunku Abdul Rahman
 U.K.
Institute of Education
 U.S.
University of Illinois
University of Alaska System
University of North Carolina at Charlotte
University of North Dakota
College of Charleston

Center of Language and Culture Teaching
The CLCT offers a variety of non-credit language courses for international students and overseas Chinese students. 
The CLCT maintains a teacher to student ratio of 1 to 8. 
In addition to language courses, the CLCT also offers a variety of cultural workshops, such as Chinese Calligraphy, Chinese food, paper cutting and traditional handicrafts.

Research Center for Adult Education
National Kaohsiung Normal University set up the Research Center for Adult Education on December 1, 1991 to actively promote lifelong learning for all citizens.
This Center’s aim is to promote adult education research and practice in southern Taiwan and thus to help citizens keep up with the time.
The center also organizes a group of adult education volunteers who enthusiastically support the center’s various activities.

Center for Environmental Laboratory Services
Members of Environmental Legionella Isolation Techniques Evaluation (ELITE) by US Centers for Disease Control and Prevention

Notable alumni
Prominent faculty members
Dr. Jin-Tan David Yang
 Huang Kuang-nan, Minister without Portfolio (2012-2014)
 Tsao Chi-hung, Minister of Council of Agriculture (2016-2017)
 Tsai Ching-hwa, Political Deputy Minister of Education
 Pan Men-an, Magistrate of Pingtung County

See also
 List of universities in Taiwan

References

Lingya District
 
1967 establishments in Taiwan
Educational institutions established in 1954
1954 establishments in Taiwan
Universities and colleges in Taiwan
Universities and colleges in Kaohsiung
Teachers colleges